Per Tidemann (29 September 1930 – 27 October 2018) was a Norwegian footballer. He played in three matches for the Norway national football team in 1956.

References

External links
 

1930 births
2018 deaths
Norwegian footballers
Norway international footballers
Place of birth missing
Association footballers not categorized by position